Ciboria amentacea, commonly known as the catkin cup, is a species of ascomycete fungus in the family Sclerotiniaceae. It is widespread in Europe and North America, where it grows on catkins of willow and alder. The species was first described by Giovanni Battista Balbis in 1804 as Peziza amentacea. Karl Wilhelm Gottlieb Leopold Fuckel transferred it to Ciboria in 1870.

References

External links

Fungi described in 1804
Fungi of Europe
Fungi of North America
Sclerotiniaceae